Ivan Stodola (10 March 1888 in Liptovský Svätý Mikuláš – 26 March 1977 in Piešťany) was Slovak dramatist and writer.

Biography

He was born in Liptovský Svätý Mikuláš into a family of professional tanners and teachers. He was educated in his hometown, Prešov and Kežmarok, and later, he studied medicine at college in Budapest and Berlin, earning a degree in 1912. He started as a doctor in Liptovský Svätý Mikuláš, and during World War I he also worked as a wartime doctor. After the war, he returned to his hometown, and became an editor of magazine Boj o zdravie (Struggle for Health). In 1933, he became a regional health inspector and in 1938 - 1939 worked at the Ministry of Health in Prague. In 1946 he earned a degree of lecturer of social pathology. In 1951 while he was working in Bratislava, he was illegitimately sentenced and incarcerated for eight years, but he was freed on amnesty two years later. Since 1954, he lived in Piešťany as a pensioner. In 1967, he earned a title of national artist. He died at the age of 89 on 26 March 1977 in Piešťany. He is now interred in the National Cemetery in Martin.

Works

Comedies 

 1925 - Žarty (book form published in 1926)
 1925 - Daňové pokonávanie (book form published in 1926)
 1926 - Náš pán minister 
 1929 - Čaj u pána senátora 
 1931 - Jožko Púčik a jeho kariéra 
 1933 - Cigánča 
 1941 - Keď jubilant plače 
 1943 - Mravci a svrčkovia
 1944 - Komédia

Tragedies 

 1928 - Bačova žena

Historical and romantic plays 

 1931 - Kráľ Svätopluk
 1938 - Veľkomožní páni
 1941 - Marína Havranová  (book form published in 1942)
 1946 - Básnik a smrť (it was later reworked and published in 1974 under name Zahučali hory)
 1948 - Ján Pankrác
 1958 - Pre sto toliarov

Other dramatical works 

 1928 - Belasý encián (book form published in 1931)
 1930 - Posledná symfónia
 1935 - Bankinghouse Khuvich and Comp.

Memoir and autobiographical works 

 1947 - Bolo, ako bolo
 1968 - Náš strýko Aurel
 1969 - Smutné časy, smutný dom
 1972 - Z každého rožka troška
 1977 - V šľapajach Hippokrata

Minor book publications 

 1933 - Z našej minulosti
 1947 - Štvrťstoročné Železnô
 1965 - Bolo ako bolo

Filmed works 

 1947 - Bačova žena (under name Varuj)
 1958 - Jožko Púčik a jeho kariéra (under name Statočný zlodej)

External links
 Ivan Stodola 
 Ivan Stodola 
 

1888 births
1977 deaths
Slovak writers
Slovak dramatists and playwrights
Writers from Liptovský Mikuláš
20th-century dramatists and playwrights
Burials at National Cemetery in Martin